Roger Froome Laughton CBE FRTS (born 19 May 1942) is a BAFTA-winning television producer and former Chief Executive of Meridian Television.

Laughton attended the state boys' grammar school King Edward VII School, Sheffield (KES). He studied at Merton College, Oxford, gaining a degree in History in 1963, and a DipEd from the Institute of Education in Oxford the following year.

He was a television producer for the BBC from 1965–90, working on programmes such as Michael Wood's In Search of the Dark Ages and Great Railway Journeys of the World. On 27 October 1986 he launched the BBC Daytime service. In November 2006 he produced the Laughton Report, which found that the local BBC television services were disruptive to local newspapers, but employed fewer journalists.

From 1991-96 he was the Chief Executive of Meridian Broadcasting (now ITV Meridian). He received the CBE in the 2000 New Year Honours for services to regional broadcasting. He became a Fellow of the Royal Television Society in 1994. He married Suzanne Taylor in 1967, and they have one daughter called Catherine.

References

External links
 IMDb

1942 births
Academics of Bournemouth University
Alumni of Merton College, Oxford
BAFTA winners (people)
BBC executives
BBC television producers
British television executives
British television producers
Commanders of the Order of the British Empire
Fellows of the Royal Television Society
ITV people
Mass media in Hampshire
People educated at King Edward VII School, Sheffield
People from the London Borough of Richmond upon Thames
Living people